Miran Ogrin (1914–1985) was a Slovene journalist who worked for the Nedeljski dnevnik weekly newspaper. He travelled extensively and published a number of travelogues. His books are packed with factual information, but have been criticized for lacking a personal note.

He won the Levstik Award in 1974 for his book on travelling the length of the Americas Od Kalifornije do Ognjene zemlje (From California to the Land of Fire).

Bibliography 

 Daleč od civilizacije: življenje plemen ob Amazonki (Far from Civilization: the Lives of Tribes along the Amazon), 1956
 Srednji vzhod (The Middle East), 1961
 Od Nila do Karatgene (From the Nile to Carthage), 1967
 Širine sveta (The Breadths of the World), 1969
 Na jugi sveta (At the South of the World), 1969
 Od Kalifornije do Ognjene zemlje (From California to the Land of Fire), 1974
 Vzhodni veter: od Urala do Kitajske in arabskih pustinj (An Eastern Wind: From the Urals to China and the Arab Deserts), 1978
 Po stopinjah Aleksandra Velikega (Following the Footsteps of Alexander the Great), 1982

References

1914 births
1984 deaths
Journalists from Ljubljana
Levstik Award laureates
Yugoslav journalists